Sphenomorphus tridigitus  is a species of skink found in Laos and Vietnam.

References

tridigitus
Taxa named by René Léon Bourret
Reptiles described in 1939
Reptiles of Laos
Reptiles of Vietnam